The 2023 IHF World Women's Handball Championship will be 26th edition of the championship, organised by the International Handball Federation (IHF), from 30 November to 17 December 2023. to be jointly hosted by Denmark, Norway and Sweden. It will be the third time in handball history that the championship is jointly hosted, the first in Sweden, and also the first to be played in three countries.

Bidding process
After Russia's withdrawal, Denmark/Norway/Sweden and Hungary entered their bids for hosting the tournament, which was awarded to the three Nordic countries by IHF Council at its meeting held in Paris, France on 28 January 2017.

Venues
The Nordic joint bid included the following six host cities and venues:

The Hungarian bid included the same cities and venues as the bid that was presented for the 2021 championship.

Qualification

1. If a country from Oceania (Australia) participating in the Asian Championships finished within the top 5, it would have qualified for the World Championships. As it finished sixth or lower, the place was transferred to the wild card spot.

Qualified teams

Preliminary round
The schedule was announced on 1 March 2023.

Group A

Group B

Group C

Group D

Group E

Group F

Group G

Group H

Presidents Cup

Group I

Group II

31st place game

29th place game

27th place game

25th place game

Main round
All points obtained in the preliminary round against teams that advance aswell, are carried over.

Group I

Group II

Group III

Group IV

Final round

Bracket

5–8th place playoffs

Quarterfinals

5–8th place semifinals

Semifinals

Seventh place game

Fifth place game

Third place game

Final

Final ranking
Places 1 to 8 and 25 to 32 will be decided by play-off or knock-out. The losers of the quarter finals will be ranked 5th to 8th according to the places in the main round, points gained and goal difference. Teams finishing third in the main round will be ranked 9th to 12th, teams finishing fourth in the main round 13th to 16th, teams finishing fifth in the main round 17th to 20th and teams ranked sixth 21st to 24th. In case of a tie in points gained, the goal difference of the main round will be taken into account, then number of goals scored. If teams will still be equal, number of points gained in the preliminary round will be considered followed by the goal difference and then number of goals scored in the preliminary round.

References

External links
Official website

2023
International handball competitions hosted by Denmark
International handball competitions hosted by Norway
International handball competitions hosted by Sweden
Women's handball in Denmark
Women's handball in Norway
Women's handball in Sweden
World Women's
World Women's
World Women's
World Women's
November 2023 sports events in Europe
December 2023 sports events in Europe